Valentina is an Italian erotic thriller television series that originally aired on Italia 1 from September 29 to December 22, 1989. It is based on the Valentina comics series by Italian artist Guido Crepax. The series follows a Milanese photographer, Valentina Rosselli, and her investigations assisted by the antiquarian Phillip Rembrant, with whom she shares an ambiguous relationship.

Despite being shot in Italian language, the actors were dubbed over by different people. Demetra Hampton was voiced by Claudia Balboni and Russel Case by Dario Penne. The entire series was dubbed into English for syndication in other countries, and the first three episodes were edited into a feature-length film version which aired on Showtime and Cinemax in their late night programming blocks.

Production

Created by Gianfranco Manfredi, the series is based on the Valentina comics by Italian artist Guido Crepax. It was co-produced between France and Spain. Among the thirteen episodes, there were only two directors: Gianfranco Giagni and Giandomenico Curi. Despite being shot in Italian language, the actors were dubbed over by different people. Demetra Hampton was voiced by Claudia Balboni and Russel Case by Dario Penne. The creator of the original comic book series Crepax later commented he found the series well scripted but thought the role of Valentina was not suited for Hampton. She was given the role after being scouted on her vacation in Los Angeles. The agent saw Hampton, took photos of her and sent them to the producer Angelo Rizzoli. Hampton was sent to Milan the next day and was immediately cast in role of Valentina. Crepax was unsatisfied with the producer's choice since he wanted the girl who would portray Valentina to be Italian, not American.

The first episode, "Baba Yaga" is a remake of Crepax's original story. It had been previously made into a film, Baba Yaga (1973), directed by Corrado Farina.

Cast
Demetra Hampton as Valentina Rosselli
Russel Case as Phillip Rembrant
Antonello Fassari as Checco
Mary Sellers as Anita
Kim Rossi Stuart as Bruno
Regina Rodriguez as Tony
Isabelle Illiers as Effie
Assumpta Serna as Baba Yaga

Episodes

See also
List of Italian television series

External links

References

Italian television series
1980s Italian television series
1990s Italian television series
1989 Italian television series debuts
1990 Italian television series endings
Television shows based on comics
Thriller television series
Erotic television series
Nudity in television